North Guard is a remote  mountain summit located near the northern end of the Great Western Divide of the Sierra Nevada mountain range, in Tulare County of northern California. North Guard ranks as the 87th highest summit in California, and the second highest point of the northern Great Western Divide. It's not as high as Mount Brewer, but offers better climbing and is considered one of the classic climbing routes in the Sierra Nevada.

History
The names North Guard and South Guard first appeared on either side of Mt. Brewer on Lieutenant Milton F. Davis’ map of 1896. A class 4 route on the northeast aspect was first climbed in 1934 by David Brower and Hervey Voge. The first ascent via the class 5.8 East Face was made in 1981 by Fred Beckey and Rick Nolting.

Climate
According to the Köppen climate classification system, North Guard is located in an alpine climate zone. Most weather fronts originate in the Pacific Ocean, and travel east toward the Sierra Nevada mountains. As fronts approach, they are forced upward by the peaks, causing them to drop their moisture in the form of rain or snowfall onto the range (orographic lift). Precipitation runoff from the mountain drains north to Bubbs Creek, and west to Roaring River, which are both tributaries of the South Fork Kings River.

See also

 List of mountain peaks of California

Gallery

References

External links

 Weather forecast: North Guard
 North Guard Rock Climbing: Mountainproject.com

Mountains of Tulare County, California
Mountains of Kings Canyon National Park
North American 4000 m summits
Mountains of Northern California
Sierra Nevada (United States)